Donde Estas Corazon may refer to:

 ¿Dónde Estás Corazón?, a 1994 song by Colombian musician Shakira
 Donde Estás Corazón, a 1999 album by Mexican musician Pablo Montero